The Florida Interscholastic Athletics Association was, during segregation, the organization of the athletic programs black high schools in Florida. It divided schools into classes to match teams from similar schools, and set up game schedules. It existed from 1932 — earlier than that there were too few black high schools — to 1968, when Florida schools integrated.

Member schools included:
 Bates Avenue, Eustis
 Belleview Senior High, Belleview
 Blanche Ely High School, Pompano Beach
 Booker T. Washington High School, Inverness
 Booker T. Washington High School, Miami
 Booker T. Washington High School, Pensacola
 Campbell Street High School, Daytona Beach
 Carver High School, Miami
 Carver Heights High School, Leesburg
 Carver-Hill School, Crestview
 Chamberlain High School, Tampa
 Crispus Attucks High School, Hollywood
 Dillard High School, Ft. Lauderdale
 Gibbs High School, St. Petersburg
 Matthew Gilbert High School, Jacksonville
 Howard High School, Ocala
 Howard High School, Orlando
 Jones High School, Orlando
 Middleton High School, Tampa
 Kennedy High School, Riviera Beach
 Lake County Training School, Lake County
 Lincoln Park High School, Clermont
 Lincoln High School, Tallahassee
 Mays High School, Miami
 Murry High School, St. Augustine
 Northwestern High School, Miami
  William M. Raines High School ,Jacksonville 
 Rochelle High School, Lakeland
 Roosevelt High School, West Palm Beach
 Shadeville High School, Crawfordville
 Tivoli High School, DeFuniak Springs
 Union Academy, Bartow

References

Further reading 
 
 

African-American history of Florida
Defunct sports leagues in the United States
High school sports conferences and leagues in the United States